46 may refer to: 
 46 (number)
 46, a 1983 album by Kino
 "Forty Six", a song by Karma to Burn from the album Appalachian Incantation, 2010
 One of the years 46 BC, AD 46, 1946, 2046